Iceland participated in the Eurovision Song Contest 2005 with the song "If I Had Your Love" written by Þorvaldur Bjarni Þorvaldsson, Vignir Snær Vigfússon, Linda Thompson and Selma Björnsdóttir. The song was performed by Selma, who was internally selected by the Icelandic broadcaster Ríkisútvarpið (RÚV) in February 2005 to represent Iceland at the 2005 contest in Kyiv, Ukraine. Selma Björnsdóttir previously represented Iceland in the Eurovision Song Contest 1999, where she placed second in the competition with the song "All Out of Luck". The Icelandic song, "If I Had Your Love", was presented to the public on 19 March 2005 during the television programme Laugardagskvöld með Gísla Marteini.

Iceland competed in the semi-final of the Eurovision Song Contest which took place on 19 May 2005. Performing during the show in position 10, "If I Had Your Love" was not announced among the top 10 entries of the semi-final and therefore did not qualify to compete in the final. It was later revealed that Iceland placed sixteenth out of the 25 participating countries in the semi-final with 52 points.

Background 

Prior to the 2005 Contest, Iceland had participated in the Eurovision Song Contest seventeen times since its first entry in 1986. Iceland's best placing in the contest to this point was second, which it achieved in 1999 with the song "All Out of Luck" performed by Selma. In 2004, Iceland placed nineteenth in the final as an automatic qualifier with the song "Heaven" performed by Jónsi.

The Icelandic national broadcaster, Ríkisútvarpið (RÚV), broadcasts the event within Iceland and organises the selection process for the nation's entry. RÚV confirmed their intentions to participate at the 2005 Eurovision Song Contest on 27 July 2004. Between 2000 and 2003, Iceland has used a national final to select their entry for the Eurovision Song Contest, while they opted to internally select their entry in 2004. For 2005, RÚV initially announced along with their participation confirmation that a national final would be used to select the Icelandic entry; however, it was later announced that an internal selection would be held instead due to financial reasons and plans for other projects.

Before Eurovision

Internal selection 

On 20 December 2004, RÚV announced that the Icelandic entry for the Eurovision Song Contest 2005 would be selected internally. On 7 February 2005, Selma Björnsdóttir who previously represented Iceland in the Eurovision Song Contest 1999 and placed second with the song "All Out of Luck" revealed that she had been approached by the broadcaster, but was yet to make a decision. Selma was confirmed as the Icelandic representative on 8 February 2005 during the RÚV evening news broadcast. In regards to her selection as the Icelandic entrant, Selma stated: "I'm very excited about all of this. We've been very busy lately. A competition such as this one requires careful planning and hard work, but there are many good times ahead, I'm sure."

On 3 March 2005, it was announced that Selma would be performing the song "If I Had Your Love", composed by Þorvaldur Bjarni Þorvaldsson and Vignir Snær Vigfússon with lyrics by Linda Thompson and Selma herself. The singer previously revealed during her announcement as the Icelandic entrant that her song would be selected in cooperation with Þorvaldsson who co-wrote her 1999 entry. "If I Had Your Love" was presented to the public along with the release of the official music video, filmed in early March 2005 and directed by Gudjon Jonsson from Spark Production, on 19 March 2005 during the television programme Laugardagskvöld með Gísla Marteini which was broadcast on RÚV and online at the broadcaster's official website ruv.is.

At Eurovision
According to Eurovision rules, all nations with the exceptions of the host country, the "Big Four" (France, Germany, Spain and the United Kingdom) and the ten highest placed finishers in the 2004 contest are required to qualify from the semi-final on 19 May 2005 in order to compete for the final on 21 May 2005; the top ten countries from the semi-final progress to the final. On 22 March 2005, a special allocation draw was held which determined the running order for the semi-final and Iceland was set to perform in position 10, following the entry from the Netherlands and before the entry from Belgium. 

During the semi-final performance, Selma was dressed in a red outfit with gold trimmings and performed choreography with four dancers dressed in white and gold outfits, all of them which also performed backing vocals. Among the backing performers was Regína Ósk, who would later represent Iceland in 2008 as part of the duo Euroband. At the end of the semi-final, Iceland was not announced among the top 10 entries in the semi-final and therefore failed to qualify to compete in the final. It was later revealed that Iceland placed sixteenth in the semi-final, receiving a total of 52 points.

The semi-final and the final were broadcast in Iceland on RÚV with commentary by Gísli Marteinn Baldursson. The Icelandic spokesperson, who announced the Icelandic votes during the final, was Ragnhildur Steinunn Jónsdóttir.

Voting 
Below is a breakdown of points awarded to Iceland and awarded by Iceland in the semi-final and grand final of the contest. The nation awarded its 12 points to Norway in the semi-final and the final of the contest.

Points awarded to Iceland

Points awarded by Iceland

References

2005
Countries in the Eurovision Song Contest 2005
Eurovision